Willing and Abel is an Australian television comedy series which was made in 1987, about two handymen.

The main cast were Grant Dodwell as "Charles Willing", Shane Withington as "Abel Moore", and Rebecca Rigg as "Angela Reddy". Their names ("Reddy", "Willing" and "Abel") were a pun on the saying: "Ready, Willing and Able".

It had problems in attaining an audience.  The show was produced as a "comedy drama" however some at the Nine Network wanted to steer it to be a heavier drama.  There was much discussion between production executives and the Network and not much agreement.  One episode scripted by Ted Roberts dealt with a hostage situation at a bank, the pathos being reinforced by series characters caught up in the action. 

The series dealt with contemporary issues in a subtle way, sometimes making observations through humour.

Broadcast
The series first aired in Australia on the Nine Network and years later went onto air in a number of other countries such as South Africa and Indonesia.

References
 "The Australian Film and Television Companion" — compiled by Tony Harrison — Simon & Schuster Australia, 1994

External links
 

Nine Network original programming
Australian comedy television series
1987 Australian television series debuts
1987 Australian television series endings